This is a list of notable towns and other geographic features named after animals.

Places named after horses 
 Alexandria Bucephalous, former city founded by Alexander the Great in memory of his beloved horse Bucephalus
 Beeswing, Dumfries and Galloway, village in Scotland renamed to honour the racing mare Beeswing
 Coronach, Saskatchewan, community in Canada named after the 1926 Derby winner Coronach
 Marvel Loch, Western Australia, small townsite named after the horse that won the Caulfield Cup in 1905
 Norseman, Western Australia, named after the founder's horse, Hardy Norseman
 Tarcoola, South Australia, named after the 1893 Melbourne Cup winner

Places named after other animals 
 Captains Flat, town in New South Wales, Australia, which may be named after a white bullock named "Captain"
 Knights Point, headland on the West Coast of New Zealand's South Island, named after a surveyor's dog called Knight
 Marco, Manawatū-Whanganui, New Zealand, settlement named after a dog owned by the district surveyor

Places
Animals